The 1967 International Cross Country Championships was held in Barry, Wales, on 18 March 1967. For the first time, an official women's competition was held.  A report on the event was given in the Glasgow Herald.

Complete results for men, junior men,  women, medallists, 
 and the results of British athletes were published.

Medallists

Individual Race Results

Men's (7.5 mi / 12.1 km)

Junior Men's (4.35 mi / 7.0 km)

Women's (1.9 mi / 3.0 km)

Team Results

Men's

Junior Men's

Women's

Participation
An unofficial count yields the participation of 152 athletes from 12 countries.

 (14)
 (19)
 (9)
 (14)
 (12)
 (9)
 (20)
 (9)
 (14)
 (11)
 (2)
 (19)

See also
 1967 in athletics (track and field)

References

International Cross Country Championships
International Cross Country Championships
Cross
International Cross Country Championships
Cross country running in the United Kingdom
Barry, Vale of Glamorgan